This article lists fellows of the Royal Society elected in 1955.

Fellows 

Sir David Robert Bates
George Washington Corner
E. J. H. Corner
Sir Alan Cottrell
Samuel Devons
Allan Watt Downie
Kingsley Charles Dunham
David John Finney
Alexander Fleck, 1st Baron Fleck
Kenneth James Franklin
Sir William Hawthorne
Donald Holroyde Hey
Sir Harold Percival Himsworth
Sir Andrew Huxley
Reginald W. James
Dan Lewis
John Wilfrid Linnett
Sir Bernard Lovell
Otto Lowenstein
Raymond Lyttleton
Alexander George Ogston
Guido Pontecorvo
James Arthur Ramsay
Frederick Clifford Tompkins
Arthur Geoffrey Walker
George Philip Wells

Foreign members

Werner Heisenberg
Lise Meitner
Otto Renner

References

1955
1955 in science
1955 in the United Kingdom